is a 1977 Japanese experimental comedy horror film directed and produced by Nobuhiko Obayashi. It is about a schoolgirl traveling with her six friends to her ailing aunt's country home, where they come face to face with supernatural events as the girls are, one by one, devoured by the home. It stars mostly amateur actors, with only Kimiko Ikegami and Yōko Minamida having any notable previous acting experience. The musical score was performed by the rock band Godiego.

Toho Studios approached Obayashi with the suggestion to make a film like Jaws. Influenced by ideas from his daughter Chigumi, he developed ideas for a script by Chiho Katsura. After the project was green-lit, it was put on hold for two years as no one at Toho wanted to direct it. However, Obayashi kept promoting the film until the studio allowed him to direct it himself. House was filmed on one of Toho’s largest sets, where Obayashi shot the film without a storyboard over a period of about two months. 

It received generally negative reviews, but was a box office hit in Japan. It received a wide release in 2009 and 2010 in North America where it received more favorable reviews and has since received a cult following.

Plot 
In Tokyo, a young girl known as Gorgeous, so called for her beauty, has plans for a summer vacation with her widowed father, a wealthy film composer who has been away in Italy on business. When he returns home, he surprises Gorgeous by announcing he has married a woman name Ryoko Ema. Distraught, Gorgeous goes to her bedroom and writes a letter to her aunt asking to come visit her for the summer instead. Gorgeous' aunt replies and allows her to come visit. Gorgeous invites her six friends: Prof, who is highly academic and very good at problem solving; Melody, who has an affinity for music; Kung Fu, who is athletic and especially skilled at kung fu; Mac, who has a big appetite; Sweet, who is bubbly and gentle; and Fantasy, who is a constant daydreamer, to come along with her. On arriving at the aunt's house, the girls are greeted by Gorgeous' aunt, to whom they present a watermelon.

After a tour of the home, the girls leave the watermelon in a well to keep it cold. Mac later goes to retrieve the watermelon and does not return. When Fantasy goes to retrieve the watermelon from the well, she finds Mac's decapitated head, which flies in the air and bites Fantasy's buttocks before she escapes. The encounter is initially disregarded by the other girls, but over time they also begin to encounter other supernatural traps throughout the house. The aunt disappears after entering the broken refrigerator, and the girls are attacked or possessed by a series of items in the house, such as Gorgeous becoming possessed after using her aunt's mirror and Sweet disappearing after being attacked by mattresses. The girls try to escape the house, but after Gorgeous is able to leave through a door, the rest of the girls find themselves locked in. The girls try to find the aunt to unlock the door but discover Mac's severed hand in a jar. Melody begins to play the piano to keep the girls' spirits up and they hear Gorgeous singing upstairs. As Prof and Kung Fu go to investigate, Melody's fingers are bitten off by the piano, and it ultimately eats her whole.

Upstairs in the house, Kung Fu and Prof find Gorgeous wearing a bridal gown, who then reveals her aunt's diary to them. Kung Fu follows Gorgeous as she leaves the room, only to find Sweet's body trapped in a grandfather clock. Panic-driven, the remaining girls barricade the upper part of the house while Prof, Fantasy and Kung Fu read the aunt's diary. They are interrupted by the giant-sized head of Gorgeous, who reveals that her aunt died many years ago waiting for her fiancé to return from World War II and that her spirit remains, eating unmarried girls who arrive at her home. The three girls are then attacked by household items. Prof shouts to Kung Fu to attack the aunt's cat, Blanche. As Kung Fu lunges into a flying kick, she is eaten by a possessed light fixture. Kung Fu's legs manage to escape and damage the painting of Blanche on the wall, which in turn kills Blanche physically. The attacked Blanche portrait spurts blood, causing the room to flood. Prof tries to read the diary, but a jar with teeth pulls her into the blood, where she dissolves. Fantasy sees Gorgeous in the bridal gown and paddles towards her. Gorgeous appears as her aunt in the reflection in the blood and then cradles Fantasy.

In the morning, Ryoko arrives at the house and finds Gorgeous in a classic kimono. Gorgeous tells Ryoko that her friends will wake up soon and that they will be hungry. She then shakes hands with Ryoko and burns her away to nothing. 

The film ends with a epigraph by Auntie about the enduring nature of love. The end credits role over non-diegetic footage of actress Kimiko Ikegami (Gorgeous) out-of-character.

Cast 

 Kimiko Ikegami as 
 Miki Jinbo as 
 Ai Matsubara as 
 Kumiko Oba as 
 Mieko Sato as 
 Masayo Miyako as 
 Eriko Tanaka as 
 Yōko Minamida as 
 Kiyohiko Ozaki as 
 Saho Sasazawa as Father
 Haruko Wanibuchi as Ryoko Ema
 Asei Kobayashi as Watermelon Farmer
 Tomokazu Miura as Auntie's Fiance
 Fumi Dan as Teacher
 Godiego (Mickie Yoshino, Yukihide Takekawa, Takami Asano, Yoji Yoshizawa, Tommy Snyder, Ryoji Asano) as themselves

Production

Development 
Following the success of the American film Jaws, a proposition came from the  Toho film studio for Nobuhiko Obayashi to develop a similar script. To find inspiration for the story, Obayashi discussed ideas with his pre-teen daughter Chigumi Obayashi. Nobuhiko sought her ideas, believing that adults "only think about things they understand ... everything stays on that boring human level" while "children can come up with things that can't be explained". Several of Chigumi's ideas were included in House such as a reflection in a mirror attacking the viewer, a watermelon being pulled out of a well appearing like a human head, and a house that eats girls. Other themes Chigumi suggested drew upon her own childhood fears. These fears included a pile of futons falling on her that felt like a monster attacking her, a large loud clock at her grandparents home, and getting her fingers caught in between her piano keys. Nobuhiko shared these story ideas with screenwriter Chiho Katsura. These ideas reminded Katsura of a short story by Walter de la Mare about an old woman who is visited by her granddaughters who then puts them in a trunk.

Obayashi incorporated themes of the atomic bombings of Hiroshima and Nagasaki into the script. Obayashi was born in Hiroshima and lost all his childhood friends from these bombings. Obayashi applied these themes with the plot element of a woman's ghost waiting for her lover's return from World War II. The woman's bitterness about the war turns her into an evil spirit that devours the girls who were unaffected by the bombings. Obayashi and Katsura had worked previously on a script titled Hanagatami before being assigned to House, which made the screenwriting process easy for both of them. Obayashi titled the script House as he felt that a foreign title for a Japanese film would be "taboo".

Pre-production 
The script for House was green-lit shortly after being presented to Toho. No directors at Toho were interested in directing the film as they felt it would end their career. Obayashi proposed that he would direct it but was turned down as he was not a staff member at Toho. House did not start filming until two years after the script's completion. Toho allowed Obayashi to announce that the film had been green-lit and began promoting the film by passing out business cards which advertised the film. In the 1960s, Obayashi created a short film titled Emotion that was popular at Japanese universities and event halls. Fans of his television commercial and film work helped him promote House before it was even in production. Products based on House that were released included manga, a novelization of the script and a radio drama. The soundtrack for the film was created and released before the film was made.

Casting 
The majority of the cast of House were not established actors, with many having primarily only worked with Obayashi on his commercials and independent films. During the two-year waiting period to start filming House, Obayashi created several commercials and began casting the seven girls from models who were in his commercials. 

The most experienced members of the main cast were Kimiko Ikegami and Yōko Minamida. Obayashi was friends with Minamida who he filmed in commercials for Calpis. Minamida was mostly working television and theater at the time and worried that taking the role of the older woman would have a negative effect on the roles she would be subsequently offered, but still agreed to play the part. 

Singer Kiyohiko Ozaki, who plays Mr. Togo in the film, was cast because he was friends with Obayashi through their shared hobby of horseback riding. 

Other roles were filled by members of the crew and their families; for example, Nobuhiko Obayashi's daughter Chigumi plays the little girl at the shoemaker's shop, and the film's production designer plays the shoemaker.

Filming 

Obayashi recalled that his producer told him that Toho was tired of losing money on comprehensible films and were ready to let Obayashi direct the House script, which they felt was incomprehensible. Toho officially green-lit the film's production after the success of the radio drama based on House. Obayashi received special permission to direct the film despite not being a member of the Toho staff.

House was filmed on one of Toho's largest sets, where Obayashi shot the film without a storyboard over a period of about two months. Obayashi described the attitude on the set as very upbeat as he often skipped, sang and played quiz games with the younger actresses on the set. Despite having fun on the set, members of the Toho crew felt the film was nonsense. Obayashi found the acting of the seven girls to be poor while trying to direct them verbally. He began playing the film's soundtrack on set, which changed the way the girls were acting in the film as they got into the spirit of the music. Actress Kimiko Ikegami was uncomfortable about a nude scene in the film. To make her more comfortable, Yoko Minamida, who had never done a nude scene before, also took off her clothes. After Obayashi saw Minamida nude, he included a topless scene for her in the film which was not in the original script.

Obayashi already had experience with special effects from his work on television commercials. Obayashi and the cameraman oversaw the special effects for the film. Obayashi desired the special effects to look unrealistic, as if a child created them. For the scene in which Ai Matsubara's character vanishes under the blood, Obayashi had her suspended nude, pouring buckets of blue paint on her to create a blue-screen chroma key effect where the blue colored parts of her body would deteriorate on camera. The outcome of a lot of these effects would be unknown until the film was completed. Obayashi stated that sometimes the effects did not turn out how he originally envisioned them.

Music 

The soundtrack for the film was created and released before the film's production. Asei Kobayashi, who worked with Obayashi on his television commercials, contributed the piano pieces for the film's soundtrack. Kobayashi felt that younger people should contribute to the film's soundtrack and suggested Mickie Yoshino and his band Godiego should contribute songs based on Yoshino's piano pieces.

Singer Ken Narita played blues harp on the track "Hungry House Blues", and also contributed vocals to "House Love Theme".

All tracks arranged by Mickie Yoshino, and produced by Yoshino with Asei Kobayashi.

Release 
House was first released on July 30, 1977 in Japan, where it was distributed by Toho. It was originally released as a double feature with the romance film Pure Hearts in Mud. Toho did not expect House to be successful, but the film became a commercial hit, becoming specifically popular with a youth audience. House was not officially screened in the United States until the distribution rights were bought by Janus Films to be released as part of their Eclipse line of DVDs. The Eclipse brand was originally conceived as a possible sub-label for cult films released by the Criterion Collection.

Janus soon began getting requests for theatrical screenings of the film. Janus initiated a small tour of theatrical showings, including two sold-out shows at the 2009 New York Asian Film Festival. In January 2010, a remastered print of House by Janus began being shown theatrically across North America, with the first of the showings taking place at the IFC Center in New York City.

House was released by the Masters of Cinema label in the United Kingdom on DVD. Bonus features on the disc included interviews with the cast and crew and the theatrical trailer. House was released by the Criterion Collection on DVD and Blu-ray on 26 October 2010. Bonus features on the disc include a making-of featurette that features interviews with the crew; director Obayashi's short film Emotion, which was first released in 1966; an appreciation video featuring American filmmaker Ti West; and a promotional trailer for House.

Reception 
The film did not receive many reviews in Japan on its initial release. The general reception among Japanese critics who did review the film was negative. Nobuhiko Obayashi won the Blue Ribbon Award for Best New Director in 1978 for House,
and, on House theatrical screenings across North America, the film began to receive generally favorable reviews. House was The New York Times critics pick stating that "Mr. Obayashi has created a true fever dream of a film, one in which the young female imagination – that of his daughter, Gorgeous or both – yields memorable results." The Seattle Times gave House three out of four stars, stating that what the film "lacks in technical wizardry it more than makes up for in playful ingenuity, injecting cheesy effects into outrageously stylized set pieces."  Slant Magazine gave the film three stars out of four, calling it "equal parts brilliant, baffling, ridiculous, and unwatchable." The New York Post gave the film three and a half stars out of four, praising the film's originality, comparing it to the work of directors Dario Argento and Guy Maddin. IndieWire included  House in their list of "Haunted House films worth discussing" calling it "the cheeriest, most infectious blood bath in cinematic history."

Richard Whittaker of The Austin Chronicle gave House a mixed review, saying that "there's surprisingly little to recommend House as a film. But as an experience, well, that's a whole other story." Michael Atkinson of The Village Voice gave the film a mixed review as well, saying that "Contemporary Japanese pop culture makes the hophead nonsense of House look quaint by comparison... though it plays like a retarded hybrid of Rocky Horror and Whispering Corridors, it is, moment to moment, its own kind of movie hijinks." Tom Russo of The Boston Globe gave the film two stars out of four, opining that films by Sam Raimi and Peter Jackson had attempted similar styled films with more success.

Legacy
In the years following its release, House has gradually accumulated a cult following and is now considered a cult classic. According to film critic and scholar Jasper Sharp, the film successfully managed to "recapture a younger audience demographic believed lost to television and Hollywood".

House has been included in multiple lists by various media outlets. In 2009, the Japanese film magazine Kinema Junpo placed House at number 160 on their list of top 200 Japanese films. It was placed at number 117 by Rotten Tomatoes based on its average review score, in their list of 200 Greatest Horror Movies of All Time. Screen Rant ranked the film at number 9 in their list of The 16 Best Japanese Horror Movies of All Time. Bloody Disgusting included the film in The 20 All-Time Best Haunted House Horror Movies, stating that the film "takes the haunted house concept to wacky extremes".

See also 
 Japanese horror
 Kaibyō – supernatural cats in Japanese folklore
 List of ghost films
 List of horror films of 1977
 Sweet Home – another Japanese haunted house movie

References

Sources

Further reading
Nobuhiko Obayashi and the Perpetual Promise of Youth- Offscreen

External links 
 
 
 
 

1977 horror films 
1970s comedy horror films 
1977 directorial debut films
Films directed by Nobuhiko Obayashi
Japanese haunted house films 
Japanese avant-garde and experimental films 
Japanese comedy horror films 
1970s Japanese-language films
Toho tokusatsu films
1977 films
Films about cats
Films set in country houses
1977 comedy films
Japanese supernatural horror films
1970s Japanese films